Kankakee County is a county located in the U.S. state of Illinois. According to the 2010 census, it has a population of 113,449. Its county seat is Kankakee. Kankakee County comprises the Kankakee, IL Metropolitan Statistical Area.

History
Starting in the 1770s, if not earlier, the area that is now Kankakee County was largely populated by the Pottawatami.

French Canadian Settlers came to Kankakee County in 1834, after the federal government signed the Treaty of Camp Tippecanoe in 1832. They were soon joined by migrants from New York and Vermont, mostly locating in Momence, Illinois. In the 1840s, most of the migrants were French Canadians or Metis and they settled in such places as Bourbonnais.

An act of the Illinois Legislature created Kankakee County out of the north part of Iroquois County and the south part of Will County in February 1853. The six original townships were Yellowhead, Rockville, Bourbonnais, Momence, Aroma Park, and Limestone. The population of the new county was about 8,000. In 1855 the two western townships (Norton and Essex) were taken from Vermilion County and added to Kankakee County. The county was named for the Kankakee River.

Geography

Climate and weather

Adjacent counties
Will County – north
Lake County, Indiana – northeast
Newton County, Indiana – east
Iroquois County – south
Ford County – southwest
Livingston County – west
Grundy County – northwest

Demographics

As of the 2010 United States Census, there were 113,449 people, 41,511 households, and 28,680 families residing in the county. The racial makeup of the county was 77.6% white, 15.1% black or African American, 0.9% Asian, 0.3% Native American, 4.0% from other races, and 2.1% from two or more races. Those of Hispanic or Latino origin made up 9.0% of the population. In terms of ancestry, 26.5% were German, 14.2% were Irish, 7.4% were English, 6.7% were Italian, 5.8% were Polish, and 3.6% were American.

Of the 41,511 households, 35.2% had children under the age of 18 living with them, 49.1% were married couples living together, 14.7% had a female householder with no husband present, 30.9% were non-families, and 25.5% of all households were made up of individuals. The average household size was 2.61 and the average family size was 3.13. The median age was 36.7 years.

The median income for a household in the county was $50,484 and the median income for a family was $59,998. Males had a median income of $49,858 versus $32,247 for females. The per capita income for the county was $22,888. About 10.8% of families and 15.0% of the population were below the poverty line, including 20.6% of those under age 18 and 8.4% of those age 65 or over.

Communities

Cities
Kankakee
Momence

Villages

Aroma Park
Bonfield
Bourbonnais
Bradley
Buckingham
Chebanse
Essex
Grant Park
Herscher
Hopkins Park
Irwin
Limestone
Manteno
St. Anne
Reddick
Sammons Point
Sun River Terrace
Union Hill

Unincorporated Communities
 Ahern
 Altorf
Deselm
 Dickeys
 Exline
Garden of Eden
 Goodrich
 Greenwich
 Illiana Heights
Illinoi (partial)
 Indian Oaks
 Leesville
 Lehigh
 Log Cabin Camp
 Saint George
 Sherburnville
Sollitt
 Sugar Island
 Whitaker
 Wichert

Townships
Kankakee County is divided into seventeen townships:

 Aroma
 Bourbonnais
 Essex
 Ganeer
 Kankakee
 Limestone
 Manteno
 Momence
 Norton
 Otto
 Pembroke
 Pilot
 Rockville
 St. Anne
 Salina
 Sumner
 Yellowhead

Politics

Although a typical prosperous Yankee “collar”-type county in the century following the Civil War, Kankakee County is currently considered a Republican-leaning swing county. In the 2008 Presidential Election, Kankakee County voted 52 percent in favor of Illinois native Barack Obama (D), giving 47 percent to John McCain (R). However, in the 2004 Presidential Election, Kankakee County voted 55 percent in favor of George W. Bush (R) and 44 percent for John Kerry (D).

Kankakee County is in Illinois's 2nd congressional district, represented by Democrat Robin Kelly (D-Matteson). Kankakee County has produced three governors: Len Small (R), Samuel H. Shapiro (D), and George H. Ryan (R).

In December 2016, Kankakee County became the only county in Illinois to have a Libertarian county board member when Jim Byrne of Bradley left the Republican Party to join the Libertarian Party. In the 2020 general election, Byrne lost reelection to Democratic candidate Heather Bryan, while Libertarian Jacob Collins was elected unopposed on the Libertarian line continuing Kankakee County's distinction of being the only county with a Libertarian board member.

Education 
The county is home to Olivet Nazarene University and Kankakee Community College.

Transportation 
Kankakee County is served by the Greater Kankakee Airport. Amtrak runs train service through the city via Kankakee station.

Major Highways 

 Interstate 57
 U.S. Highway 45
 U.S. Highway 52
 Illinois Route 1
 Illinois Route 17
 Illinois Route 50
 Illinois Route 102
 Illinois Route 113
 Illinois Route 114
 Illinois Route 115

See also
National Register of Historic Places listings in Kankakee County, Illinois

References
Specific

General

External links

 
 Atlas of Kankakee County from 1883

 
Illinois counties
Illinois placenames of Native American origin
1853 establishments in Illinois
Populated places established in 1853